Three baronetcies were created for different families bearing the name of Halford, but related to one another.  The first baronetcy was created in 1641 for Richard Halford in the Baronetage of England.  It became extinct in 1780 with the death of the seventh and last baronet. The second baronetcy was created in 1706, also in the Baronetage of England, but became extinct in 1720 in the second generation.  The third and last baronetcy was created in 1809 in the Baronetage of the United Kingdom for a prominent physician descended maternally from the fifth Baronet of the previous creation.  It too became extinct with the death of the fourth Baronet (third generation) in 1897.

Halford baronets, of Wistow, co Leicester (18 December 1641; extinct 1780)
Sir Richard Halford, 1st Baronet (–1658), Son of Edward Halford, Gentleman, of Langham, Rutland and Dionesia Berry, daughter of Nicholas Berry, Gentleman, of Langham, Rutland, descended from a junior branch of the Berry family of Colyton, Devon. Richard Inherited the Wistow estate in 1608 upon the death of his uncle, Andrew Halford. Richard was Sheriff of Leicestershire in the 19th year of James I's reign, Sheriff of Rutland in 1619 and 1631, created a baronet on 18 December 1641.  He and his eldest son Andrew (who died 1657, a year before his father) were notable for their allegiance to Charles I. Richard was a personal friend and moneylender to Charles I. Charles I having used Wistow Hall as his place of rest whilst in the county and notably using it as his station before the Battle of Naseby.  He married twice, Firstly to Isabel Bowman, daughter of George Bowman, Gentleman, of Medbourne, Leicestershire by whom he had 2 sons Andrew and George. He Secondly married, to Joane Adams née Archer. Sir Richard and his 2 sons are memorialised on a grand effigy in St Wistan's Church, Wistow, Leicestershire. Sir Richard was succeeded by his grandson Thomas (son of his eldest son Andrew)
Sir Thomas Halford, 2nd Baronet (1638-1679), Son of Andrew Halford, Esquire, of Kilby, Leicestershire and Mary Hackett, Daughter of Humphrey Hackett, Gent, of Creeton, Lincolnshire. Commissioner of the Leicestershire Militia in 1659. Sheriff of Leicestershire in 1662. Arrested in 1668 for killing Edmund Temple, Esquire, in a tavern quarrel and received a royal pardon the same year. He married Selina Welby, daughter of William Welby, Esquire, of Denton, Lincolnshire and was succeeded by his son
Sir Thomas Halford, 3rd Baronet (c. 1663 – 3 May 1690) MP for Leicestershire 1689–1690.  He died unmarried, and was succeeded by his next brother
Sir William Halford, 4th Baronet (died 1695) who was succeeded by his next brother
Sir Richard Halford, 5th Baronet (died 5 September 1727), great-grandfather maternally of Sir Henry Halford the physician and first baronet of the 1809 creation. He married Mary Cotton, dau of Rev. William Cotton of Broughton Asley, and had five sons and three daughters, including
Sir William Halford, 6th Baronet (1709–1768) and
Thomas Halford (died 1766), father of four sons (of whom the youngest Charles became the 7th and last Baronet), and
Elizabeth Halford (c. 1703 – 11 June 1772, aged 69) who married John (or William or Thomas) Smalley, an alderman of Leicester, and had with other issue, a second daughter:
Hester Smalley (c. 1740 – 2 April 1791, aged 51) whose eldest surviving son was
Sir Henry Halford (below).
Sir Richard Halford, 5th Baronet, was succeeded by his eldest son
Sir William Halford, 6th Baronet (1709–1768) who died unmarried, and was succeeded by his nephew (youngest son of the next brother Thomas Halford)
Sir Charles Halford, 7th Baronet (1732 – 21 July 1780) the last baronet of the 1641 creation, son of Thomas Halford, second son of the 5th Baronet.  His widow Sarah, Lady Denbigh (whom he married in 1769) continued to enjoy the property until her death 2 October 1814. Lady Halford remarried 1783 Basil Feilding, 6th Earl of Denbigh, but had no issue by either marriage. In 1814, the property finally passed to his first cousin once removed Sir Henry Fielding.

Halford baronets, of Welham, co. Leicester (27 June 1706; extinct 1720)

This baronetcy was created on 27 June 1706 for William Halford, possibly descended from the Halfords of Wistow. (The evidence is not certain, because the first baronet's grandfather and namesake was identified in visitations by herald. This baronetcy was not mentioned in Burke's Extinct Baronetage 1841, possibly because the second and third baronets may have been Jacobites. 
Sir William Halford, 1st Bt., of Welham, co Leics (1663 – 1 March 1709). He married c. 1692 Lady Frances Cecil (d. 1698), second surviving daughter of James Cecil, 3rd Earl of Salisbury and Lady Margaret Manners.
Sir James Halford, 2nd Baronet (died ca. 1715)
Sir William Halford, 3rd Baronet (c. 1693 - 25 March 1720)

Halford baronets, of Wistow, co Leicester (27 September 1809; extinct 1897)
This baronetcy was created on 27 September 1809 for Henry Halford (2 October 1766 – 9 March 1844), a prominent society physician who was physician extraordinary to the King since 1793.  Halford was born Henry Vaughan in 1766, son of Dr. James Vaughan, and changed his name to Halford by Act of Parliament in expectation of inheriting Wistow Hall and the Halford wealth from the last of the Halfords.  The baronetcy became extinct with his grandson, the fourth baronet, in 1897.

Sir Henry Halford, 1st Baronet, born Henry Vaughan (1766–1844) who inherited Wistow Hall in 1814 with the death of Lady Denbigh, the long-lived widow of the last of the previous Halford baronets. He was President of the Royal College of Physicians 1820–1844 (his death). He was succeeded by his only son:
Sir Henry Halford, 2nd Baronet  (22 April 1797 – 22 May 1868); he was MP for Leicestershire South 1832–57. Like his father, he was a classical scholar. His wife was Barbara Vaughan (26 July 1806 – 24 June 1869); she was his first cousin and daughter of Rt Hon. Sir John Vaughan (brother of the first baronet) by his wife Hon. Augusta St. John, widow of Andrew St John, 13th Baron St John of Bletso. Their son was:
Sir Henry St. John Halford, 3rd Baronet (9 August 1828 – 4 January 1897), who was the first Chairman of Leicestershire County Council (established 1889) and a very prominent Volunteer and marksman. He married Elizabeth Ursula Bagshawe (27 October 1829 – 30 January 1897), daughter of W.J. Bagshawe, of The Oaks near Sheffield. The last Sir Henry had no direct descendants. On his death, Wistow Hall was inherited by his friend the 3rd Lord Cottesloe, who as T F Fremantle had joined with him and W E Metford in their experimental work on the rifle.  The 4th Baron Cottesloe, whose daughter and son-in-law inherited Wistow Hall in 1958, was named partly for this friend of his father.
Reverend Sir John Frederick Halford, 4th and last Baronet (16 May 1830 – 4 April 1897). He married Ismena Andrews (19 April 1838 -6 February 1912), third daughter of John S. Andrews.

Arms

Halford's original arms were: Argent, a greyhound passant sable, on a chief azure three fleurs-de-lis or.

For his unremitting professional attentions to the duke of York during his last illness (1826) he received, by royal warrant, a grant of armorial augmentations and supporters. For the centre fleur-de-lis was substituted a rose argent; and, in further augmentation, was added, on a canton ermine a staff entwined with a serpent proper, and ensigned with a coronet composed of crosses patée and fleurs-de-lis (being that of a prince of the blood-royal). As a crest of augmentation, a staff entwined with a serpent or, as on the canton. As supporters, two emews proper, each gorged with a coronet, composed of crosses patée and fleurs-de-lis.  According to the source, this is the only time that a practising physician was granted supporters.

The 2 emews (or emus) came from a present of the birds from George IV to his physician; these birds did much damage to the garden at Wistow, and one was eventually stuffed and kept in a case.

References

Thomas Wotton, Edward Kimber, Richard A. Johnson. The baronetage of England, pp. 423-424. Retrieved from Google Books on 12 March 2009.
A genealogical and heraldic history of the extinct and dormant baronetcies: Halford, of Wistow p. 238. Retrieved from Google Books on 12 March 2009.

External links
Halford family monuments. Retrieved 12 March 2009.

Extinct baronetcies in the Baronetage of England
Extinct baronetcies in the Baronetage of the United Kingdom